A. T. M. Abdul Mateen was a Member of the 4th National Assembly of Pakistan as a representative of East Pakistan.

Career
Mateen was a Member of the  4th National Assembly of Pakistan representing Comilla-IV. He served as the Deputy Speaker of the National Assembly.

References

Pakistani MNAs 1965–1969
Living people
Year of birth missing (living people)